Vuyani Bungu (born 26 February 1967) is a South African former professional boxer who competed from 1987 to 2005. He held the IBF junior-featherweight title from 1994 to 1999, and the IBO featherweight title from 2004 to 2005.

Professional career
Bungu turned pro in 1987 and in 1994 captured the International Boxing Federation Super Bantamweight Title with a shocking upset victory over Kennedy McKinney, a fight named 1994 Ring Magazine Upset of the Year.  After the victory, Bungu defended the title an impressive 13 times before relinquishing the belt in 2000 to move up to featherweight to take on Naseem Hamed.  Hamed defeated the super bantamweight former champion, TKO'ing Bungu in the 4th round.  In 2002, he was beaten by Lehlohonolo Ledwaba and retired in 2005 after losing to Thomas Mashaba.  He compiled a career record of 39-5-0.

Professional boxing record

References

External links

1967 births
Living people
People from Mdantsane
International Boxing Federation champions
World super-bantamweight boxing champions
South African male boxers
International Boxing Organization champions
Featherweight boxers
Sportspeople from the Eastern Cape